William Garnet James  (28 August 1892 – 10 March 1977) was an Australian pianist and composer and a pioneer of music broadcasting in Australia.

Early years
James was born in Ballarat in 1892. He studied piano at the Melbourne University Conservatorium, graduating in 1912. On the recommendation of the visiting pianist Teresa Carreño, he headed overseas to study in London and Brussels with Arthur De Greef, a former pupil of Franz Liszt and Camille Saint-Saëns. It is around this period that James composed his Six Australian Bush Songs, which were dedicated to Dame Nellie Melba.

After being rejected for military service, James worked for the British Red Cross during the World War I. In 1915, he made his public debut as a pianist with the Queen's Hall Orchestra. By this time he had begun to publish his compositions, and in 1916 his ballet music By Candlelight was performed in concert at the Savoy Theatre, London.

ABC career
In 1923 James returned to Australia, eventually taking up a teaching position at the Melbourne University Conservatorium. In the late 1920s, he joined the newly formed Australian Broadcasting Company, the forerunner of the Australian Broadcasting Commission (ABC). He became the latter's first Director of Music in 1931, a position he would hold until his retirement in 1957. It was during his tenure that the ABC established its state orchestras.

From 1935, James made regular overseas trips to persuade international artists to perform in Australia with the newly formed ABC orchestras. During World War II, when such exchanges became impractical, the ABC instead organised local talent competitions, which James adjudicated. James's selection of repertoire for concert performances was conservative, possibly because he felt contemporary composers might not have a broad enough appeal for radio audiences.

Compositions
James wrote many pieces for voice, choir and piano, but his most enduring pieces are still his 15 Australian Christmas Carols in three sets, in which traditional Christmas themes were given outback settings, such as "The Three Drovers". ABC staff writer John Wheeler wrote the lyrics for these carols. The Australian Christmas Carols can still be found in music catalogues today. A fourth set of Australian Christmas Carols was written in the 1970s and given to the Wayside Chapel, Kings Cross. They have since disappeared.

Outback themes were common in his secular songs as well, in compositions such as "Bush Song at Dawn", familiar to many Australian children of the 1950s and 1960s through the school songbooks of the period. Other compositions by James have rustic English themes ("A Warwickshire Wooing") or claim Māori inspiration (Six Maori Dances).

Honours and recognition 
James was awarded the Coronation Medal in 1937. He was appointed an Officer of the Order of the British Empire in the 1960 Birthday Honours for "service to Australian culture".

Personal life
James was married twice. His first marriage, in 1921, was to the Russian opera singer Saffo Buchanan, née Drageva (known professionally as Saffo Arnav who had just emerged from an anulled marriage to Jack Buchanan), by whom he had a son and a daughter. Buchanan died in 1955, and in 1960 James married again, to widow Caroline Mary Dally-Watkins, née Skewes. They divorced in 1967.

Footnotes

References
 "William G. James (1892–1977), Australian Music Centre
William G. James, Music Australia website.

Further reading

External links
 "Carol of the Birds", melody: William G. James, words: John Wheeler; ingeb.org
 "The Three Drovers", James/Wheeler (1948); Tom Wills tww.id.au

1892 births
1977 deaths
20th-century Australian musicians
20th-century classical composers
Australian classical composers
Australian classical musicians
Australian male classical composers
Australian Officers of the Order of the British Empire
20th-century Australian male musicians